The Football Conference season of 1987–88 (known as the GM Vauxhall Conference for sponsorship reasons) was the ninth season of the Football Conference.

Overview
Lincoln City, who had been relegated to the Conference a year earlier in the first season of automatic promotion and relegation between the Conference and the Fourth Division of the Football League, won the Conference title to reclaim their place in the Football League, where they replaced the bottom placed Fourth Division club Newport County.

The season featured an experimental rule change, whereby no attacker could be offside directly from a free-kick. The change was not deemed a success, as the attacking team invariably packed the six yard box for any free-kick (and had several players stand in front of the opposition goalkeeper). The experiment was swiftly dropped.

New teams in the league this season
 Lincoln City (relegated from the Football League 1986–87)
 Fisher Athletic (promoted 1986–87)
 Macclesfield Town (promoted 1986–87)
 Wycombe Wanderers (promoted 1986–87)

Final league table

Results

Top scorers in order of league goals

Promotion and relegation

Promoted
 Lincoln City (to the Football League Fourth Division)
 Aylesbury United (from the Southern Premier League)
 Chorley (from the Northern Premier League)
 Yeovil Town (from the Isthmian League)

Relegated
 Newport County (from the Football League Fourth Division)
 Bath City (to the Southern Premier League)
 Dagenham (to the Isthmian League)
 Wealdstone (to the Southern Premier League)

References

External links
 1987–88 Conference National Results

National League (English football) seasons
5